The Badlands Saloon is a novel by Jonathan Twingley, an American artist and illustrator. Published by Scribner in 2009, the 224-page hardcover tells the story of Oliver Clay, and his life-changing summer in a small North Dakota town.

Setting
The town is Marysville − once a booming oil town, now a tourist spot − a "Wild West fishbowl" with a state-of-the-art amphitheater, an Old West Shooting Gallery, bumper cars, and a glad-handing mayor with his own daily radio show. Like much of America, "the town had become a strange version of itself...a generic vision of what towns once looked like when there were Cowboys and Indians and wagon wheels and campfires. But there was an authenticity to it all, too."

The town resembles Medora, North Dakota. At the south entrance to the Theodore Roosevelt National Park, Medora provides a touristy western experience with wooden planked sidewalks, old fashion ice cream parlors, and buggy rides. Just like the Marysville in Twingley's novel, Medora offers several museums, the Cowboy Hall of Fame, the Badlands Shooting Gallery, Medora Mini Golf, and the Burning Hills Amphitheater with nightly productions of the Medora Musical. Both Medora and Marysville were named after a French aristocrat. Also resembling Marysville, the entire economy of the real-life Medora (with its 112 residents and 0.37 square miles) is subsidized by a foundation - the Theodore Roosevelt Medora Foundation.

Style
The novel is uniquely constructed. It is not a graphic novel with comic book panels, but an illustrated novel with 38 full-color illustrations covering 76 pages. It has the straightforward simplicity of Aesop's Fables yet is highly literary, with references to Søren Kierkegaard, Ernest Hemingway,  John Steinbeck, Allen Ginsberg, Lanford Wilson, F. Scott Fitzgerald, Jack Kerouac, and others.

It is also a personal memoir, yet explosively populated with characters reminiscent of The Iceman Cometh, the Coen Brothers' Fargo, and a Fellini circus. This profound originality prompted Howard Frank Mosher to declare "The Badlands Saloon is that best of all novels: one that has never been written before."

Critical reception
The novel evoked the lyricism of Faulkner's Yoknapatawpha County and Garrison Keillor's Lake Wobegon.

The New York Times Book Review stated "The Badlands Saloon is filled with hallucinatory incidents and flamboyant barflies...Before the summer’s out, young Ollie will learn the usual life lessons, amid much faux wisdom that crumbles under the glare of the trailer park lights. The book’s chief attraction is Twingley’s sketchbook of illustrations, whose broad outsider-art strokes work in concert with Ollie’s naive ruminations.” 

Booklist signalled Twingley as "an up-and-coming artist" and praised his "uniquely stylized characters...a gallery of portraits rendered in prose, punctuated by visuals, and delivered with unsentimental but heartfelt honesty."

According to Library Journal Review, The Badlands Saloon "feels like catching up with an old friend over beers. A wonderful read; highly recommended for lovers of the American landscape and fiction readers of all kinds."

References

American autobiographical novels
Novels set in North Dakota
2009 American novels
2009 debut novels